While My Pretty One Sleeps is a 1989 novel by Mary Higgins Clark. It takes place in New York City.  It was number 10 in the Publishers Weekly best selling book list that year.  It is listed in the OCLC top 1000 works most widely held by libraries.

Plot

Neeve Kearney runs a dress shop. One of her popular customers, Ethel Lambston, a writer, is found dead in a small cave.

Inspiration
The character of  Bishop Stanton is based on Father Joseph A. O'Hare, president of Fordham University.

In other media
While My Pretty One Sleeps was made into a television film directed by Jorge Montesi, and starring Connie Sellecca, released 12 January 1997 in the US.

References

External links
 
 Bookrags study guide

1989 American novels
American novels adapted into films
Novels by Mary Higgins Clark
Simon & Schuster books
American thriller novels
American novels adapted into television shows